Brujos Mario Calvo de Izalco are a Salvadoran professional football club based in Izalco, Sonsonate.
The club currently plays in the Segunda División de El Salvador.

History

The club purchased the license of Quequeisque F.C. to participate in the Segunda División in 2016.

Honours

Domestic honours
First Division of El Salvador
 Champions: N/A
 Segunda División Salvadoreña and predecessors 
Runners Up: (1) : Clausura 2018
 Tercera División Salvadoreña and predecessors 
 Champions: N/A

Current squad
As of:

President

List of Coaches
 Ricardo López Tenorio (1978 – 1980)
 Jose Raul Chamagua (1993)
 Milton Velásquez
 Jorge Calles (Jan 2016 – Dec 2016)
 Marcelo Escalante (Jan 2017 – Dec 2017)
 Juan Ramón Paredes (Dec 2017 – June 2018)
 Ruben Alonso (June 2018 – June 2019)
 Manuel Melgar (Sep 2019 - )

External links
 Mario Calvo: La vida de un club – Culebrita Macheteada – Futbol El Salvador

References

Football clubs in El Salvador